Tievenadarragh is a townland of area  in County Down, Northern Ireland. It is situated in the civil parish of Loughinisland and the historic barony of Kinelarty.

Places of interest
The Loughinisland Churches are located in Tievenadarragh. They consist of the remains of three ruined churches from the 13th to the 17th centuries and a graveyard. Located on an island in Loughinisland Lake, they are accessible by a causeway. The churches have been designated state-care historic monuments at grid ref: J4234 4537.

See also
List of townlands in County Down

References

Townlands of County Down
Civil parish of Loughinisland